Sequía, as known in Spain, or Crimes Submersos in Portugal, is a Spanish–Portuguese thriller television series which stars Elena Rivera, Marco d'Almeida, Guilherme Filipe, Miryam Gallego and Rodolfo Sancho, among others. It is produced by Radiotelevisión Española (RTVE) and Rádio e Televisão de Portugal (RTP) in collaboration with Atlantia Media and Coral Europa. It premiered on La 1 and RTVE Play on 18 January 2022 and on RTP1 on 21 January 2022.

Premise 
The plot starts with the discovery of two skeletons at the bottom of a water reservoir as the ongoing event of severe drought has led to the unflooding of the drowned village of Campomediano. Police inspector Daniela Yanes takes over the case. The plot gets to involve two families living at different sides of the border between Portugal and Spain.

Cast

Production and release 

Produced by Spanish and Portuguese public broadcasters RTVE and RTP in collaboration with Atlantia Media and Coral Europa, the series was written by Arturo Ruiz and Daniel Corpas whereas the direction was tasked to Joaquín Llamas and Oriol Ferrer.  
Director Joaquín Llamas described the series as a "thriller mixed with a 'family noir'". José de Castro was responsible for the score. Shooting began in the Madrid region in June 2021. The crew later moved to Cáceres, Extremadura. Production in Cáceres ended in late July and then moved to the Lisbon region. Production also worked in Leiria. Originally intended to consist of six 70-minute-long episodes, it was restructured to fit a format of 8 episodes of around 60 minutes.

The series was pre-screened at the "IberSeries Platino Industria" Festival on 30 September 2021.

References 

2022 Portuguese television series debuts
2022 Spanish television series debuts
Portuguese drama television series
2020s Spanish drama television series
Spanish thriller television series
Television shows set in Spain
Television shows set in Portugal
Television shows filmed in Spain
Television shows filmed in Portugal
RTVE shows
RTVE Play original programming
Rádio e Televisão de Portugal original programming